The Lee Navigation is a canalised river incorporating the River Lea (also called the River Lee along the sections that are navigable). It flows from Hertford Castle Weir to the River Thames at Bow Creek; its first lock is Hertford Lock and its last Bow Locks.

Name 
The Lee Navigation is named by Acts of Parliament and is so marked on Ordnance Survey maps. Constructed elements and human features are spelled Lee, such as the canal system and Lee Valley Park. The un-canalized river is spelled Lea, along with other natural features such as Lower Lea Valley.

History 
The River Lea is a major tributary of the River Thames. It has a long association with navigation, as the marshes of Walthamstow have produced a dugout canoe from the Bronze Age and parts of a Saxon barge. According to the Anglo-Saxon Chronicle, the river was used by Viking raiders, and King Alfred changed the level of the river to strand Guthrum and his fleet. In more peaceful times, it became important for the transport of grain from Hertfordshire, but navigation of its southernmost tidal reaches of Bow Creek were difficult due to its tortuous meanders.

There is documentary evidence that the river was altered by the Abbot of Waltham to improve navigation in 1190, and in 1221, a pipe was laid across the river, which had to be protected from "the oars or poles of the watermen." The first Act of Parliament for improvement of the river was granted in 1425, this also being the first Act granted for navigational improvement in England. A second Act was passed in 1430, and both authorised local landowners to act as commissioners, who could make improvements to the river including scouring or dredging, and could recoup the cost of the work by levying tolls.

By 1571, the river was an important route for the carriage of grain to London, and the City of London obtained another act to authorise improvements. This included making new cuts, and creating towpaths on both sides of the river. Shoals were removed, and a cut, probably the section which is now called Bow River from Old Ford Locks to Bow Locks, was excavated, which was not subject to any tolls. The plan for a branch from the river to the north of London was not implemented. One innovation was the construction of a pound lock at Waltham Abbey, Essex, in 1577. This had mitred gates at each end, and was probably the second lock to be built in England, although it was the first to be built on a river. It inspired Vallens to write a poem entitled "A tale of Two Swannes" about it in 1590. The remainder of the control of levels was carried out by "staunches" or "turnpikes", consisting of a single vertically lifting gate in a weir, through which boats were pulled against the current.

The New River was an attempt to supply clean water from near Ware to the citizens of London, which was completed in 1633. However, the springs at Great Amwell soon proved to be inadequate, and water was drawn from the Lea. The increased extraction of water had a detrimental effect on milling and navigation, and by the early 1700s it had become clear that major work would be needed to produce a solution.

Smeaton's design
A petition was presented to Parliament resulting in a further Act of 1739. While recognising the right of the New River Company to extract water, it also enshrined the rights of the millers and bargemen. To resolve a problem where the New River works had blocked the Manifold Ditch, and boats had been forced to use the mill stream to Ware Mill, the mill was bought by the company, and the associated lock became an official right of way. The previous administration by commissioners was replaced by a body of trustees, which it was hoped would be better able to manage the navigation. Although at least two flash locks were built, including one to assist passage past the mill at Broxbourne, there was still friction between the bargemen and the millers, since the use of a flash lock tended to lower the water level above it, to the detriment of the mill. In 1765, the trustees therefore asked John Smeaton to assess the navigation and make recommendations for its improvement.

Smeaton made a survey of the river and produced a report in 1766, in which he recorded that there were 18 staunches at the time, with a lock at Ware and tidal gates at Bow. He recommended that the staunches should be replaced by pound locks, and that several new cuts should be made. These recommendations formed the basis for a Parliamentary bill, which was opposed by the owners of the Shoreditch to Enfield turnpike road, the West Ham waterworks and the Waltham Abbey Royal Gunpowder Mills, who were all concerned that their rights would be affected. However, the trustees were granted an Act on 29 June 1767 and appointed Thomas Yeoman to oversee the work at their first meeting held two days later.

The Act authorised the construction of several new stretches of canal, including the Edmonton Cut from Flanders Weir at Chingford to the mill stream at Walthamstow, the Hackney Cut from Lea Bridge to Old Ford, and the Limehouse Cut to bypass the tight bends of Bow Creek near the River Thames. Yeoman was also responsible for setting out towing paths, designing 35 roving bridges, and construction of lock gates. For the Limehouse Cut, Yeoman proposed a cut from Bow tidal gates to Dingley's Wharf at Limehouse, which would shorten the distance to London considerably, since it would avoid the long passage around the Isle of Dogs. Mr Dingley, owner of the wharf and a trustee, was awarded part of the contract, and the cut was expected to open on 2 July 1770, but some brickwork failed and had to be repaired. A bridge collapsed in December, but traffic soon developed, and the cut had to be widened to allow barges to pass one another along its entire length. The widening was completed on 1 September 1777.

The trustees decided to finance the work with a loan, and advertisements appeared in the London Gazette and other newspapers, indicating that they wished to raise £35,000. The response was huge, with £161,500 being offered, and subscribers were chosen by ballot. Yeoman was overworked, and Edward Rubie was appointed to assist him in February 1769. New cuts and pound locks were opened at Waltham Abbey, Edmonton and Hackney in 1769. In total,  of new cuts were constructed, with 12 new locks. Some on the locks, such as Homerton Lock and Pickett's Lock, were built on new sections, while others, such as Stanstead Lock, replaced an existing flash-lock. The works were completed to a tight schedule, and with most of it finished, Yeoman resigned in July 1771, although the reasons for his resignation were not recorded.

Development
There were further improvements throughout the 19th century, including an Act in 1850 to authorise new lock cuts at Hoddesdon, Carthagena Lock (Broxbourne), Waltham Marsh, Tottenham, Walthamstow, Hackney, Leyton and Bromley-by-Bow and new locks at Hunter's Gate (Bow Bridge) and Old Ford. The River Lee Water Act of 1855 authorised a new lock at Amwell Marsh and the removal of Stanstead Lock. Edmonton Lock was to be removed and Pickett's Lock rebuilt. In 1868 the Lee Conservancy Board was formed to take over control of the river from the former trustees. They established the Lee Conservancy Police, who policed the Lee until merged with the British Transport Police in 1948.

The Lee Navigation bought the Stort Navigation in 1911, and instituted further improvements, including reconstruction of the locks between Enfield and Hertford, the width being increased from : by the 1930s, 130-ton barges could reach Enfield, and 100-ton barges to  Ware and Hertford.

The navigation was nationalised in 1948, and control passed to the British Transport Commission. Where possible the locks from Bow Locks through to Ponder's End Lock were duplicated and mechanised - the only exception being Pickett's Lock. In 1962, the British Transport Commission was wound up, and control passed to the British Waterways Board. Commercial traffic effectively ended in the 1980s.

During the 1950s horse-drawn lighters were still journeying as far as Hertford. By 1980 commercial traffic extended no higher than the Enfield Rolling Mills at Brimsdown, with just one tug, the Vassal, regularly at work on the river. Powered by a 120 hp Gardner diesel engine, she would typically tow a train of two lighters loaded with timber from Bow to Hahn's Wharf at Edmonton. There are efforts currently underway to revive commercial traffic on the canal with a plan to transport rubbish for incineration at the Edmonton Incinerator.

Governance
With the passing of the Land Drainage Act 1930, the Lee Conservancy area was treated as a special case, with details laid out in section 80 of that act. The Lee Conservancy Catchment Board was created, which inherited some of the powers conferred by the Lee Conservancy Acts, dating from 1870 to 1921, and gave it additional powers in common with other Catchment Boards, the most important of which was that they could levy rates on county councils and county borough councils throughout their catchment area, to fund drainage works. The members of the Catchment Board consisted of all the members of the Lee Conservancy Board, together with six additional members. The Board were given additional powers, enabling them to hold land without a licence in mortmain, as a result of the Lee Conservancy Catchment Board Act 1936. Further change occurred on 1 January 1948, as a result of the Transport Act 1947. Some of the functions of the Conservancy Board were taken over by the British Transport Commission, when most of the operational canals and waterways were nationalised, and the board was then disbanded. However, where the board had responsibilities for water supply, fisheries, the control of pollution and land drainage, these functions were transferred to the Lee Conservancy Catchment Board. This was authorised by the Lee Conservancy Catchment Board (Additional Functions) Regulations 1947.

The River Boards Act 1948 saw the formation of river boards to replace catchment boards throughout England and Wales, but the Lee Conservancy Catchment Board, together with the Thames Conservancy Catchment Board, were excluded from this. River boards were replaced by river authorities as a result of the Water Resources Act 1963, but again the Lee Conservancy was treated as a special case. It made provision that the responsibilities for water conservation outlined in that Act could be given to the Lee Conservancy Catchment Board by the joint decision of the Minister of Housing and Local Government, the Minister of Agriculture, Fisheries and Food, and the Minister of Transport. Those provisions, somewhat modified for the special circumstances of the catchment area, were conferred by the Lee Conservancy Catchment Board (New Functions of River Authorities) Order 1965.

The transport functions of the waterway were transferred to the British Waterways Board, subsequently known as British Waterways, from 1 January 1963, as part of the breakup of the British Transport Commission authorised by the Transport Act 1962. These functions are now managed by the Canal and River Trust, a charitable organisation that took over the role of British Waterways from 2 July 2012. There have been three further changes in the environmental management of the waterway. The Water Act 1973 abolished river authorities, and created ten regional water authorities. The Lee Conservancy was no longer a special case, and became part of the Thames Water Authority. This structure lasted until the passing of the Water Act 1989, which split the water authorities apart, privatising the water supply, sewerage and sewage disposal functions, and transferring the environmental management of river systems including the Lee to the National Rivers Authority. The final change was a result of the Environment Act 1995, which abolished the National Rivers Authority and replaced it by the Environment Agency.

Recreation
Much of the Lee Navigation is within Lee Valley Park, a multi-county regional park and open space preserve. Local jurisdictions also maintain parks on the canals in Lee Valley Park.

Photo gallery

See also

Bow Back Rivers
Locks and Weirs on the River Lea
Canals of Great Britain
History of the British canal system

Bibliography

References

External links

River Lee Navigation
Photographs of Edmonton timber wharves (1983)
Photo of the last horse-drawn barge (1955)
History of the locks on the Lee & Stort Navigation
History of the Lee Navigation (1190–1790)
Love the Lea project
images & map of mile markers seen along the Lee & Stort Navigations

 
Canals opened in 1777